Diyap Yıldırım or Diyap Ağa  (1852 in Çemişgezek – 1932 in Sivas) was a Turkish politician of Kurdish origin and the leader of the Ferhatuşağı tribe in Dersim. He represented Dersim (now Tunceli) in the Grand National Assembly of Turkey from 1920 to 1923.

References

Deputies of Tunceli
Turkish Kurdish politicians
1852 births
1932 deaths